Winifred Burks-Houck (August 20, 1950 – May 6, 2004) was an environmental organic chemist and the first female president of National Organization for the Professional Advancement of Black Chemists and Chemical Engineers (NOBCChE), serving from 1993 – 2001.

Personal life 
Winifred Burks-Houck was born on August 20, 1950, in Anniston, Alabama to parents Matthew Burks and Mary Emma Goodson-Burks. She was the great, great, great-granddaughter of noted abolitionist Harriet Tubman.

Burks-Houck pledged as a member of the Delta Sigma Theta Sorority as an undergraduate student at Dillard University. After graduation, she remained a loyal member of the San Francisco-Peninsula Alumnae Chapter of the sorority to continue their mission of community advocacy and activism. She served in various leadership roles during her time in alumnae chapter, holding positions as the president from 1987 – 1989, vice-president, chair of fundraising and chapter coordinator for the annual Soul Stroll for Health. At the Delta Sigma Theta's 43rd annual national convention, Burks-Houck was recognized as a Project Cherish Honoree for her outstanding work in the field of science.

Education 
Burks-Houck began her education in Anniston, Alabama having attended both elementary and high school in the city. Burks-Houck continued her education and earned a Bachelor of Arts degree in chemistry from Dillard University followed by a Master of Science Degree in Organic Chemistry from Atlanta University.

Career 
Burks-Houck began her professional career in 1983 working as an environmental chemist at the Lawrence Livermore National Laboratory on environmental protection projects with an interest in ensuring worker safety.

National Organization for the Professional Advancement of Black Chemists and Chemical Engineers (NOBCChE) 
Burks-Houck was dedicated to the establishment of the NOBCChE on the West Coast and its national endeavours. She was invited to Dakar, Senegal to represent NOBCChE as an environmental chemist and deliver a presentation titled: "Environmental Applications and Regulatory Reporting". She served as the first chair of the San Francisco Bay Area Chapter from 1984 – 1990 organizing educational and professional development events for the community. Burks-Houck was elected in 1991 as the national vice-president of NOBCChE, a position she held until elected as the first female president of the organization in 1993. Burks-Houck held this role for an unprecedented four consecutive terms before stepping down in 2001. Her involvement was credited with more than 100% increase in the number of student and professional chapters, instituting new scholarships through public and private entities, updating telephone and computer systems at the National Office, and establishing the Science Quiz Bowl and the Science Fair at the National level. Burks-Houck was also credited with building partnerships with other organizations such as the American Association for the Advancement of Science (AAAS), American Chemical Society (ACS), American Indian Science and Engineering Alliance, National Aeronautics and Space Administration (NASA), and the Society for the Advancement of Chicanos and Native Americans in Science (SACNAS).

Burks-Houck's legacy with the NOBCChE was expanded upon in 2010, after her death, through the creation of the Winifred Burks-Houck Professional Leadership Awards and Symposium to honour the contributions of African American women in science and technology. There are four categories of awards: Distinguished Lecturer, Professional Awardee, Graduate Student Awardee, and Undergraduate Awardee to recognize scientific achievements, creativity, leadership, and community service.

References 

1950 births
2004 deaths
People from Anniston, Alabama
Dillard University alumni
Atlanta University alumni
Organic chemists
American women chemists